The Patriotic Knights is a Chinese wuxia television series adapted from Liang Yusheng's novel Xiagu Danxin. It was directed by Kuk Kwok-leung, and starred Chen Long, Stephanie Hsiao, Wallace Chung and He Meitian. It was first shown in China in 2010 on Guizhou TV even though it already completed shooting in around 2006–2007.  The Tai Seng DVD set was released in 2007.

Plot
The series is set in the late Ming dynasty during the reign of the Tianqi Emperor, when the government is very corrupt on all levels. The eunuch Wei Zhongxian dominates the political scene and plans to bring the wulin (martial artists' community) under his control and usurp the throne. He instigates Meng Shentong to kidnap Li Shengnan, the leader of the Heavenly Demonic Cult, and force her to hand over a highly coveted martial arts manual, the Baidu Zhenjing. The great hero Jin Shiyi interferes, rescues Li Shengnan, and combines forces with her to defeat Meng Shentong. However, Li Shengnan eventually dies from her injuries. Jin Shiyi feels deeply saddened by her death and decides to leave the mainland and settle on a remote island.

20 years later, Wei Zhongxian feels threatened by Jiang Haitian, Jin Shiyi's apprentice, who has garnered much support from the wulin and started a rebel movement against the Ming government. Shi Baidu, the chief of the Six Harmonies Gang, has secretly defected to Wei Zhongxian's side and promised to help Wei deal with the rebels. The opportunity arises when Jiang Haitian invites guests from throughout the wulin to attend his daughter's wedding during the Qixi Festival. Shi Baidu's younger sister, Shi Hongying, is a righteous and kind person, unlike her brother. She tries to advise her brother against helping Wei Zhongxian but he ignores her, so she sneaks out of the house and travels to Jiang Haitian's residence to warn him about the impending danger.

Around this time, Jin Shiyi's son, Jin Zhuliu, sets foot on the mainland and goes on a series of adventures. By chance, he encounters Li Nanxing, Li Shengnan's nephew, and becomes sworn brothers with him.

Cast

 Chen Long as Jin Zhuliu
 Stephanie Hsiao as Shi Hongying
 Wallace Chung as Li Nanxing
 He Meitian as Zhong Yanyan
 Jing Gangshan as Jin Shiyi
 He Jiayi as Gu Zhihua
 Niu Mengmeng as Li Shengnan
 Eddy Ko as Jiang Haitian
 Shen Junyi as Shi Baidu
 Jewel Lee as He Daniang
 Norman Chui as Meng Shentong
 Siqin Gaoli as Feng Miaochang
 Akina Hong as Dong Shisanniang
 Ji Chunhua as Shuai Mengxiong
 Wang Deshun as Zhong Changtong
 Li Donghan as Qin Yuanhao
 Wang Jianxin as Yang Hao
 Liu Weihua as Ouyang Jian
 Li Guohua as Wei Zhongxian
 Chen Zhihui as Yuanhai
 Bai Zhicheng as Taoist Shushi
 Tan Jianchang as Li Dun
 Wang Li as Jiao Lei
 Li Kelong as Qingfu
 Wang Shuo as Ye Muhua
 Han Zhenhua as Feng Zichao
 Ma Ji as Wen Daozhuang
 Cheng Wu as Wen Shengzhong
 Li Hong as Gu Zhonglian
 Xu Yena as Jiang Xiaofu
 Yuan Wenqing as Yuwen Xiong
 Wang Qun as Yuchi Jiong
 He Sirong as Qi Shengyin
 Xie Jiaqi as Sha Qianfeng
 Tan Xinrou as Mudan
 Zhang Ying as Shaoyao
 Xu Xiangdong as Chen Tianyu
 Feng Jing as Chen Guangzhao

External links
  The Patriotic Knights on Sina.com

Chinese wuxia television series
Television shows based on works by Liang Yusheng
2010 Chinese television series debuts
Television series set in the Ming dynasty
Mandarin-language television shows
Television series set in the 17th century